Erika Katharina Höghede (born 21 August 1963) in Sollefteå, Sweden is a Swedish actress. She has appeared in many TV programs and theatre plays since 1997.

She has created several SVT programs, among them Cirkuskiosken and Bella och Theo. Since 2010 she is a junior lecturer at the Stockholm Academy of Dramatic Arts. She has worked for Sveriges Television, UR, the Pero Theatre, the Boulevard Theatre, the Orion Theatre and the Giljotin Theatre.

Höghede grew up in Sollefteå, Huskvarna, Bålsta and Uppsala and was educated at Stockholm University 1983–84. She has studied at Teaterverkstan in Stockholm and Teatret Cantabile Due in Copenhagen.

Selected filmography
2010 - Drottningoffret (TV)
2007 - Höök (TV)
2007 - Beck – Gamen
2000 - Det grovmaskiga nätet
2000 - Rederiet (TV)
1998 - Waiting for the Tenor
1997 - Skärgårdsdoktorn
1996 - Kalle Blomkvist – Mästerdetektiven lever farligt
1995 - Älskar, älskar inte
1995 - Petri tårar

References

External links
Official website

Swedish stage actresses
Living people
1963 births
Swedish television actresses